Casey Malone (born 6 April 1977 in Wheat Ridge, Colorado) is an American discus thrower. His personal best is 68.49 metres, achieved in June 2009 in Fort Collins, Colorado.

Achievements

External links
 
 

1977 births
Living people
People from Wheat Ridge, Colorado
Sportspeople from the Denver metropolitan area
Track and field athletes from Colorado
American male discus throwers
Athletes (track and field) at the 2004 Summer Olympics
Athletes (track and field) at the 2008 Summer Olympics
Olympic track and field athletes of the United States
USA Outdoor Track and Field Championships winners